The 1927 Centenary Gentlemen football team represented the Centenary College of Louisiana as a member of the Southern Intercollegiate Athletic Association (SIAA) during the 1927 college football season. Centenary posted an undefeated 10–0 record and beat four Southwestern Conference schools. It is one of the school's best ever teams.

Schedule

References

Centenary
Centenary Gentlemen football seasons
College football undefeated seasons
Centenary Gentlemen football